Ben Hur or Benhur is an unincorporated community in Limestone County, Texas, United States, located about 25 miles east of Waco.  Named "Cottonwood" when it was founded in the late 19th century, it changed its name to "Ben Hur" (possibly in honor of Lew Wallace, author of the book Ben Hur) in 1895, because several other communities in Texas were named "Cottonwood."  A post office was located there from 1895 until 1906.
https://www.latimes.com/archives/la-xpm-1986-02-07-me-5340-story.html
The town was also mentioned in the 1993 drama film A Perfect World where a suspect, Terry James Pugh, was found dead near this area.

References

3. https://www.latimes.com/archives/la-xpm-1986-02-07-me-5340-story.html

External links
Ben Hur, Texas - Texas State Historical Association
Ben Hur or Benhur, Texas - Texasescapes.com

Unincorporated communities in Limestone County, Texas
Unincorporated communities in Texas